The Libya national under-17 football team (Arabic: منتخب ليبيا لكرة القدم تحت 17 سنة) is the national representative for Libya in international under-17 football competition, and is controlled by the Libyan Football Federation. The team competes in the Africa U-17 Cup of Nations, UNAF U-17 Tournament, and the FIFA U-17 World Cup, which is held every two years. The under-17 team also participates in local and international friendly tournaments.

Honours 
UNAF U-17 Tournament:
Runners-up (3): 2008, 2012, 2017

Tournament Records

FIFA U-16 and U-17 World Cup record

CAF U-17 Championship record

UNAF U-17 Tournament record

Arab Cup U-17 record

Current squad

See also 
 Libya national football team
 Libya national under-23 football team
 Libya national under-20 football team

External links 
 Libyan Football Federation - official site 

African national under-17 association football teams
under-17